Sadhaaram is a 1956 Indian Tamil-language film starring P. Bhanumathi, K. R. Ramasamy and Gemini Ganesan. Based on the play of the same name by Sankaradas Swamigal, it was released on 13 April 1956, and was commercially unsuccessful.

Plot

Cast

Production 
Sadhaaram is the third film based on the play of the same name by Sankaradas Swamigal, after a 1930 silent film and Naveena Sadaram (1935).

Soundtrack 
The music was composed by G. Ramanathan. Lyrics were penned by Thanjai N. Ramaiah Dass and A. Maruthakasi.

References

External links 
 

1950s Tamil-language films
1956 films
Films scored by G. Ramanathan
Indian films based on plays